King's Highway 169, commonly referred to as Highway 169, was a provincially maintained highway in the Canadian province of Ontario. The highway connected Highway 12 at Brechin, southeast of Orillia, with Highway 69 at Foot's Bay. The  route included an  concurrency with Highway 11 between Washago and Gravenhurst. Located within Simcoe County and the District Municipality of Muskoka, the highway also provided access to the community of Bala.

Highway169, originally the southern leg of Highway69, was created in 1976 when the latter was rerouted along Highway 103 south of Foot's Bay to Waubaushene. Highway69 was itself established in 1936 along the eastern side of Lake Couchiching between Atherley and Washago. It was extended to Parry Sound the following year. In 1952 the highway was rerouted south of Washago to end in Brechin.

Highway169 remained unchanged from 1976 to 1998, when it was decommissioned during the highway transfers of 1998. On January1 of that year, the route was designated as Simcoe County Road169 from Brechin to Washago, and Muskoka District Road169 from Gravenhurst to Foot's Bay. Through Muskoka District, the road is also known as the Frank Miller Memorial Route.

Route description 

The former route of Highway169 has remained relatively unaltered since it was downloaded in 1998. It proceeds north at a point where Highway12 begins to curve west towards Orillia, passing through meadows and forests and the occasional ranch. It passes through the community of Udney, curves northeast and intersects the Monck Road while curving back northwards. The Mnjikaning First Nation territory backs onto the highway at this location, but primary access is via Simcoe County Road44. The route continues in a straight line through the communities of O'Connell and Fawkham, crossing the Black River immediately south of the latter. Gently curving to the northeast, it enters the village of Washago, after which it interchanges with Highway 11 south of the Severn River.

While Highway169 no longer exists a provincial route, Highway11 continues to travel north today as a divided four-lane expressway, crossing the Severn River into the Canadian Shield, where the terrain is rougher, rockier, and dotted with lakes and swamps. Former Highway169 splits from Highway11 at the southern entrance to Gravenhurst (Exit169), with the latter curving to the east. The route resumes independently, exiting the expressway and entering the town through a rock cut. It follows Bethune Drive, Brock Street and Bay Street through the town. Exiting Gravenhurst, the highway follows close to the western shore of Lake Muskoka, serving recreational cottages. The route passes north of the Devils Gap Trail, which follows the old Bala–Gravenhurst Colonization Road, then passes through the community of Torrance where it encounters a junction with District Road 13.

The highway presses north, crossing both a Canadian National and Canadian Pacific railway in two separate locations. After intersecting Muskoka District Roads 29 and 26, it enters the community of Glen Orchard. Within that community, the route intersects the former western terminus of Highway 118 (which now ends at Highway11), then gradually curves west to hug the southern shore of Lake Joseph. After a winding  drive west, the highway enters Foot's Bay and ends at the former route of Highway69.

History 

Highway169 was created in the mid-1970s as part of a renumbering plan of existing highways; it originally formed the southerly leg of Highway69. Due to the complex nature of that highway, only the history of the Brechin – Foot's Bay road is covered here.

Highway69 was first designated on August5, 1936. At that time, it connected Atherley and Washago along the Rama Road, now Simcoe County Road 44.
On April1, 1937, the Department of Northern Development merged into the Department of Highways (DHO) (the predecessor to the modern Ministry of Transportation), opening roads north of the Severn River for improvement. The road between Gravenhurst and Parry Sound, and on to Pointe au Baril, subsequently became an extension of Highway69, with the road between Washago and Gravenhurst becoming a concurrency with Highway11. The section of road between Washago and Gravenhurst was assumed by the DHO on June9, while the section between Gravenhurst and the Muskoka– Parry Sound boundary was assumed on August25.

In 1952, the southern  of the route, along the east side of Lake Couchiching via what is now Simcoe County Road44, was transferred to local municipalities and a new, longer route was designated to the east, merging with Highway12 north of Brechin.
This routing remained in place until May15 1976, when the province redirected the southern portion of Highway69 along the route of Highway 103, between Waubaushene and Foot's Bay, in order to create a more direct route between Toronto and Sudbury. The route of Highway69 between Foot's Bay and Brechin was consequently renumbered as Highway169.

Highway169 remained unmodified throughout its two decades of existence. On January1, 1998, both sections of Highway169 were transferred to the municipalities in which they were located; the southern section was transferred to Simcoe County, and the northern section to the District Municipality of Muskoka.
Both sections are still numbered 169, though they are now county roads.

Major intersections

References 

169